John Fitzgerald Bray (born June 17, 1970, in Van Nuys, California) is a former American Heavyweight boxer.

Amateur career
Bray had a solid amateur career prior to turning professional.  He won the National AAU Heavyweight Championship in 1991.  Bray won the United States Amateur 201-lb championship by defeating Bobby Harris via TKO in semi-finals and a 4–1 victory over Javier Alvarez in finals.  In November 1991 he lost in the World Amateur Championships 14–6 to Bert Teuchert.  In 1992 Bray competed in the Olympic Trials Western Regionals and won via KO over Wesley Martin and then beat Sammy Denson 3–2, but then lost to Marlon Simpkins 5–0. Bray had a successful amateur record of 124–12.

Outside the Ring
Bray was also a part-time private investigator and carried a gun for his job.  In August 1991, Bray accidentally shot himself in mouth with a 9mm hand gun.

Training career
Bray currently serves as a boxing trainer, and trains fighter Cisse Salif and Taishan Dong

Professional career
Bray turned professional in 1992 and experienced limited success as a pro.  He fought few notable opponents, and retired in 1998 after a loss to Josh Gormley.

Professional boxing record

|-
|align="center" colspan=8|15 Wins (5 knockouts, 10 decisions), 3 Losses (1 knockout, 2 decisions), 2 Draws
|-
| align="center" style="border-style: none none solid solid; background: #e3e3e3"|Result
| align="center" style="border-style: none none solid solid; background: #e3e3e3"|Record
| align="center" style="border-style: none none solid solid; background: #e3e3e3"|Opponent
| align="center" style="border-style: none none solid solid; background: #e3e3e3"|Type
| align="center" style="border-style: none none solid solid; background: #e3e3e3"|Round
| align="center" style="border-style: none none solid solid; background: #e3e3e3"|Date
| align="center" style="border-style: none none solid solid; background: #e3e3e3"|Location
| align="center" style="border-style: none none solid solid; background: #e3e3e3"|Notes
|-align=center
|Loss
|
|align=left| Josh Gormley
|TKO
|1
|24/04/1998
|align=left| San Jose Arena, San Jose, California
|align=left|
|-
|Draw
|
|align=left| Cliff Couser
|PTS
|6
|15/09/1995
|align=left| Las Vegas, Nevada
|align=left|
|-
|Win
|
|align=left| Jesse Prieto
|TKO
|4
|18/08/1995
|align=left| Las Vegas, Nevada
|align=left|
|-
|Win
|
|align=left| Michael Green
|MD
|6
|03/08/1995
|align=left| Las Vegas, Nevada
|align=left|
|-
|Draw
|
|align=left| Craig Brinson
|PTS
|6
|05/11/1994
|align=left| Las Vegas, Nevada
|align=left|
|-
|Win
|
|align=left| Craig Payne
|PTS
|8
|06/05/1994
|align=left| Terre Haute, Indiana
|align=left|
|-
|Win
|
|align=left| John Basil Jackson
|PTS
|6
|15/02/1994
|align=left| Indianapolis, Indiana
|align=left|
|-
|Loss
|
|align=left| Will Hinton
|UD
|6
|06/12/1993
|align=left| Rosemont Horizon, Rosemont, Illinois
|align=left|
|-
|Win
|
|align=left| John Basil Jackson
|PTS
|6
|13/11/1993
|align=left| Greensburg, Indiana
|align=left|
|-
|Win
|
|align=left|Corner Miller
|KO
|1
|21/10/1993
|align=left| Hammond, Indiana
|align=left|
|-
|Win
|
|align=left| Brian Morgan
|PTS
|6
|14/09/1993
|align=left| Indianapolis, Indiana
|align=left|
|-
|Win
|
|align=left| Ahmad Gihad
|PTS
|6
|27/08/1993
|align=left| Union Hall, Countryside, Illinois
|align=left|
|-
|Win
|
|align=left| Ahmad Gihad
|PTS
|6
|11/08/1993
|align=left| South Bend, Indiana
|align=left|
|-
|Win
|
|align=left| Danny Blake
|MD
|6
|26/04/1993
|align=left| Rosemont, Illinois
|align=left|
|-
|Win
|
|align=left| Andre Smiley
|PTS
|6
|13/04/1993
|align=left| Hammond, Indiana
|align=left|
|-
|Win
|
|align=left| David Payne
|PTS
|4
|02/02/1993
|align=left| Indianapolis, Indiana
|align=left|
|-
|Loss
|
|align=left| Will Hinton
|MD
|4
|30/01/1993
|align=left| Las Vegas, Nevada
|align=left|
|-
|Win
|
|align=left| Joey Christjohn
|TKO
|1
|14/10/1992
|align=left| Rosemont Horizon, Rosemont, Illinois
|align=left|
|-
|Win
|
|align=left| Brian Morgan
|KO
|1
|01/09/1992
|align=left| Indianapolis, Indiana
|align=left|
|-
|Win
|
|align=left| John Warrior
|KO
|1
|01/08/1992
|align=left| Muscatine, Iowa
|align=left|
|}

References

External links
 
 John Bray Interview
 John Bray Boxing Foundation

1970 births
Living people
Boxers from Los Angeles
Winners of the United States Championship for amateur boxers
People from Van Nuys, Los Angeles
American male boxers
Heavyweight boxers